Thomas L. Hickner is a United States Democratic politician from Michigan and the former county executive of Bay County. He previously served five terms in the Michigan House of Representatives.

Hickner graduated from Michigan State University in 1979 with a degree in political science and from Western Michigan University with a master's degree in business administration. He worked for Congressman J. Bob Traxler and State Senator Jerome T. Hart before joining the Senate Fiscal Agency in 1979.

Hickner was elected to the House in 1982 and served ten years. He was elected Bay County Executive in 1992 and was re-elected five times, serving until 2016. In 2016, he ran for re-election to a sixth term, but lost the Democratic primary to former Congressman and State Senator Jim Barcia, who went on to win the general election unopposed.

References

1954 births
Living people
People from Bay City, Michigan
Politicians from Newport News, Virginia
Michigan State University alumni
Northern Michigan University alumni
County executives in Michigan
Democratic Party members of the Michigan House of Representatives
20th-century American politicians